Rio nell'Elba is a frazione of the comune of Rio, in the Province of Livorno in the Italian region Tuscany, located about  southwest of Florence and about  south of Livorno.

Main sights
 Orto dei Semplici Elbano, a botanical garden

References

External links
Official website 

Cities and towns in Tuscany
Frazioni of Rio, Italy
Elba